The Scotland national kabaddi team was established in 2012, and represents the country in the National Kabaddi Association. It participated in the 2012 Kabaddi World Cup with a team including some rugby players from the University of Strathclyde, losing all three group matches.

In 2019, Scotland hosted the European Championships for the first time in their history where the Scotland kabaddi team got to the Semi Finals and were put out by Poland who went on to win the 2019 European Championships.

References

Kabaddi
National kabaddi teams
2012 establishments in Scotland
National kabaddi team